The St. Louis Refrigerator Car Company (SLRX) was a private refrigerator car line established on February 3, 1878, by Anheuser-Busch, the brewer's first subsidiary. SLRX was formed to facilitate large-scale distribution of the A-B's products via the U.S. rail network. The SLRX not only built its own bunkerless reefers, but maintained and operated them as well.

In 1919 the firm was acquired by Manufacturers Railway Company (MRS), another A-B transportation subsidiary that provided switching service to the brewery and interchange connection with the common carrier railroads serving St. Louis. The St. Louis Refrigerator Car Company currently owns the "Dome Railway Service" in Wood River, Illinois.

St. Louis Refrigerator Car Company Roster, 1900–1970:

References
 White, John H.  (1986).  The Great Yellow Fleet.  Golden West Books, San Marino, CA.  .
 

Anheuser-Busch
Companies established in 1878
Refrigerator car lines of the United States